Robert Boyd (10 April 1870 - Unknown), of Russell, Ontario, Canada, was the inventor of a system of shorthand, Boyd's Syllabic Shorthand. The system was first published in 1903, with a later publication in 1912.

References

1870 births
Year of death missing
Creators of writing systems
People from Russell, Ontario